Holstein is a village in Adams County, Nebraska, United States. The population was 188 at the 2020 census. It is part of the Hastings, Nebraska Micropolitan Statistical Area.

History
Holstein was platted in 1887 when the Kansas City and Omaha Railroad was extended to that point. A large portion of the early settlers being natives of Germany and Denmark caused the name Holstein, after Schleswig-Holstein, to be selected.

Geography
Holstein is located at  (40.464769, -98.649877).

Demographics

2010 census
As of the census of 2010, there were 229 people, 95 households, and 54 families residing in the village. The racial makeup of the village was 99.5% White and 0.5% Native American. Hispanic or Latino of any race were 1.4% of the population.

There were 95 households, of which 30.5% had children under the age of 18 living with them, 40.0% were married couples living together, 7.4% had a female householder with no husband present, 9.5% had a male householder with no wife present, and 43.2% were non-families. 36.8% of all households were made up of individuals, and 11.6% had someone living alone who was 65 years of age or older. The average household size was 2.25 and the average family size was 2.94.

The median age in the village was 40.5 years. 24.3% of residents were under the age of 18; 9.2% were between the ages of 18 and 24; 21% were from 25 to 44; 28.4% were from 45 to 64; and 16.8% were 65 years of age or older. The gender makeup of the village was 57.9% male and 42.1% female.

2000 census
As of the census of 2000, there were 229 people, 91 households, and 65 families residing in the village. The population density was 1,023.7 people per square mile (401.9/km2). There were 99 housing units at an average density of 442.6 per square mile (173.7/km2). The racial makeup of the village was 99.56% White, and 0.44% from two or more races. Hispanic or Latino of any race were 0.44% of the population.

There were 91 households, out of which 28.6% had children under the age of 18 living with them, 65.9% were married couples living together, 2.2% had a female householder with no husband present, and 27.5% were non-families. 22.0% of all households were made up of individuals, and 13.2% had someone living alone who was 65 years of age or older. The average household size was 2.52 and the average family size was 2.92.

In the village, the population was spread out, with 24.0% under the age of 18, 6.1% from 18 to 24, 29.7% from 25 to 44, 21.4% from 45 to 64, and 18.8% who were 65 years of age or older. The median age was 38 years. For every 100 females, there were 92.4 males. For every 100 females age 18 and over, there were 102.3 males.

As of 2000 the median income for a household in the village was $41,591, and the median income for a family was $46,750. Males had a median income of $27,404 versus $25,313 for females. The per capita income for the village was $17,999. About 6.7% of families and 10.3% of the population were below the poverty line, including 12.5% of those under the age of eighteen and 31.7% of those 65 or over.

References

Villages in Adams County, Nebraska
Hastings Micropolitan Statistical Area